Strange is a British television supernatural drama series, produced by the independent production company Big Bear Productions for the BBC, which aired on BBC One. It consists of a single one-hour pilot episode screened in March 2002, followed by a series of six one-hour episodes broadcast in the summer of 2003. The supernatural plot involved a defrocked priest's mission to destroy demons.

Plot
The series follows former priest John Strange, dismissed from the clergy under mysterious circumstances. He was implicated in a number of gruesome murders, murders that he says were done by demons. Now he seeks those responsible and to clear his name. To help him in his hunt for demons, John has Toby, a technological expert who is in charge of the equipment John uses to sense the presence of demons, and Kevin. Kevin has Down's syndrome, which appears to enable him to sense the presence of demons and is often an early warning that something supernatural is about to happen in the area. Jude, a former scientist who works as a nurse, is interested because she found out that her partner Rich was a demon. With Rich dead, her main concern is that the son they had together, Joey, could also be a demon. John's mission is hampered by Canon Black, who is intent on denying the presence of dark forces.

Setting
The demons in Strange include non-human and near human forms. Near human demons are distinguishable by their inhuman eye colouring which varies from blood red, silver or gold. These demons are capable of concealing their eye colour with a sort of nictitating membrane which makes the eyes appear human. They are capable of interbreeding with humans and many such demons have assimilated themselves into human society to cover their activities.

Non-human demons live on the fringes of society or hibernate in isolated areas. They reputedly have long lifespans, and can only be killed through special methods. When a demon dies its body will explode in a ball of flame.

Cast
 Richard Coyle as John Strange
 Samantha Janus as Jude
 Ian Richardson as Canon Black
 Andrew-Lee Potts as Toby (Bryan Dick in the pilot)
 Timmy Lang as Kevin
 William Tomlin as Joey

Production
All six episodes of the series were written by Andrew Marshall, a scriptwriter primarily known for his comedy work. It was directed by Joe Ahearne, who had previously been responsible for both writing and directing the World Productions vampire serial Ultraviolet for Channel 4.

The six episodes were shot on location and at Ealing Studios, and filming concluded on 23 December 2002. Filming was split into two blocks; the first (made up of episodes 1, 2 and 5) was directed by Aherne and the second by Simon Massey, who had previously worked on Ballykissangel. Marshall wrote the first regular episode as an introduction to the characters and the scenario, despite having already done so for the pilot. He attributed this to the BBC's policy of not repeating pilots; he had to introduce new viewers who may not have seen the pilot.

A second season was planned and Kevin was to have been found dead in the first episode.

Episodes

Broadcast and reception
Broadcast on Saturday nights, the series was hampered by frequent timeslot changes, the long gap between the pilot and the series and the BBC's decision not to repeat the pilot before the series aired. The viewing figures were low, and a second series was not commissioned. However, to mark five years since the original broadcast, creator Andrew Marshall wrote an additional short story entitled 'Ramset.'

In the United States, Strange has been broadcast by the cable television network Showtime, on one of its specialist subsidiary channels and in July 2009 the series started airing on Chiller. The UK Sci-Fi Channel screened all seven episodes of Strange in both 2006 and 2007.

References

External links
 
Strange (2002 pilot) at the Internet Movie Database.
Strange (2003 series) at the Internet Movie Database.

2000s British drama television series
2002 British television series debuts
2003 British television series endings
BBC television dramas
Television shows set in London
British horror fiction television series
English-language television shows
2000s British horror television series
British supernatural television shows